Nightmares...and Other Tales from the Vinyl Jungle is the fifth studio album by American rock band The J. Geils Band. The album was released on September 25, 1974, by Atlantic Records.

Track listing
All songs written by Peter Wolf and Seth Justman, except as noted.

Personnel
Peter Wolf – lead vocals
J. Geils – guitar
Magic Dick – harmonica
Seth Justman – keyboards 
Danny Klein – bass
Stephen Jo Bladd – drums

Additional personnel
George Jessel – spoken word vocals on "Funky Judge"

Production
Producer: Bill Szymczyk
Engineers: Allan Blazek, Kevin Herron, Bill Szymczyk
Digital remastering: George Marino
Special assistance: Juke Joint Jimmy
Photography: Peter Himmelman

Charts
Album

Singles

References

1974 albums
The J. Geils Band albums
Albums produced by Bill Szymczyk
Atlantic Records albums